Rostislav Shavel (born 2 April 2001) is a Belarusian professional footballer who plays for Falko Cherkassy.

Football career 
As of 2021, he last played for Gorodeya, becoming a free agent after the club was liquidated.

Political persecution (since 2020) 

Throughout 2020 and 2021 he was arrested multiple times for participation in the peaceful protest against falsified 2020 election results. After serving multiple short-term prison sentences (15, 15 and 3 days), on June 8, 2021, by a joint statement of nine organizations, including the Viasna Human Rights Centre, the Belarusian Helsinki Committee, he was recognized as a political prisoner. On September 22, 2021 he was given three years of house arrest with restricted movement.

References

External links 
 
 
 Rastsislau Shavel's page on the website of the Viasna Human Rights Centre

2001 births
Living people
Belarusian footballers
Belarus youth international footballers
Association football forwards
FC Gorodeya players
Political prisoners according to Viasna Human Rights Centre